The Clear Fork Brazos River is the longest tributary of the Brazos River of Texas.

A tributary of the Clear Fork Brazos River is Paint Creek, which is dammed to form Lake Stamford.

See also
Canyon Valley, Texas
Double Mountain Fork Brazos River
Duffy's Peak
Hobbs, Texas
White River (Texas)
Yellow House Canyon
List of rivers of Texas

References

External links

Brazos River
Rivers of Texas
Rivers of Scurry County, Texas
Rivers of Young County, Texas
Rivers of Fisher County, Texas
Rivers of Jones County, Texas
Rivers of Shackelford County, Texas
Rivers of Throckmorton County, Texas